Aquabacter spiritensis is a bacterium from the genus of Aquabacter which was isolated from the Spirit Lake in Washington in the United States.

References

External links
Type strain of Aquabacter spiritensis at BacDive -  the Bacterial Diversity Metadatabase

Hyphomicrobiales
Bacteria described in 1993